Miss France 2020 was the 90th edition of the Miss France pageant, held on 14 December 2019 at the Le Dôme de Marseille in Marseille. Vaimalama Chaves of Tahiti crowned her successor Clémence Botino of Guadeloupe by the end of the event. She represented France at Miss Universe 2021, placing in the top 10. The competition was hosted by Jean-Pierre Foucault, Sylvie Tellier, and Miss France 2019 Vaimalama Chaves, with performances by Robbie Williams and Chaves. Footballer Amandine Henry served as the jury president.

Background
On 11 April 2019, it was confirmed by the Miss France Organisation that the 2020 edition of the Miss France competition will be held on 14 December 2019 at Le Dôme in Marseille. While the overseas collectivities of Saint Martin-Saint Barthelemy and Saint Pierre and Miquelon typically alternate appearances at Miss France each year, Saint Pierre and Miquelon withdrew their participation due to a lack of local candidates; Saint Martin-Saint Barthélemy were thus invited in their place, allowing them to compete twice in a row. For this edition's trip abroad, the delegates traveled to Tahiti in French Polynesia, where they took part in a variety of events, until returning to Marseille to begin rehearsals.

Results

Special awards

Scoring

Preliminaries 

A jury composed of partners (internal and external) of the Miss France Committee selected fifteen delegates during an interview that took place on 11 December to advance to the semifinals. This was the first time the amount of semifinalists increased from twelve to fifteen.

Top fifteen 
In the top fifteen, a 50/50 split vote between the official jury and voting public selected five delegates to advance to the top five. Each delegate was awarded an overall score of 1 to 15 from the jury and public, and the five delegates with the highest combined scores advanced to the top five. The girls with the sixth and seventh highest combined scores were afterwards designated as the fifth and sixth runners-up, respectively, despite not advancing in the competition.

Top five 
In the top five, public voting determined which delegate is declared Miss France.

Pageant

Format
On 19 September 2019, it was announced that the theme for the 2020 competition would be "The Misses' World Tour," with competition rounds inspired by international destinations. Finals night featured a performance by British singer Robbie Williams, making this his second time performing at Miss France after doing so at the 2010 competition. The thirty contestants were initially divided into three groups of ten, with each group taking part in an initial presentation round. The three presentation rounds were themed after travel to the United Kingdom and Cool Britannia, Russia, and Spain and bullfighters, respectively. Afterwards, the thirty contestants competed in the one-piece swimsuit round, inspired by travel to the United States and the Wild West, followed by an evening gown round themed after travel to Japan.  After this, the top fifteen were announced. After the selection of the top fifteen, the semifinalists competed in a two-piece swimsuit round themed after their overseas trip to French Polynesia, featuring a guest appearance from Miss France 2019 Vaimalama Chaves. After the two-piece swimsuit round, the top five were announced. The top five then competed in a fashion presentation round, themed after travel to Africa.

Judges
Amandine Henry (jury president) – footballer
Laëtitia Milot – actress
Christophe Michalak – pastry chef, author, and television host
Slimane Nebchi – singer
Vitaa – singer
Mareva Galanter – singer, actress, and Miss France 1999 from Tahiti
Denis Brogniart – television host and journalist

Contestants
The 30 delegates have been selected.

Notes

References

External links

December 2019 events in France
Miss France
2019 beauty pageants
Beauty pageants in France
Entertainment events in France
Competitions in France